Directed by Dr Catherine Warner, the Centre for Maritime Research and Experimentation (CMRE) is an established, world-class scientific research and experimentation facility that organizes and conducts scientific research and technology development, centred on the maritime domain, delivering innovative and field-tested Science & Technology (S&T) solutions to address defence and security needs of NATO. 

The CMRE is an executive body of NATO's Science and Technology Organization (STO) along with the NATO Collaboration Support Office and Office of the Chief Scientist (OCS).

Located in La Spezia (Italy), the CMRE is built on more than 60 years of experience in its former establishments as the NATO Undersea Research Centre (NURC) and SACLANTCEN and has produced a cadre of leaders in ocean science, modelling and simulation, acoustics and other disciplines, as well as producing critical results and understanding that have been built into the operational concepts of NATO and the Nations.

CMRE operates two research vessels that enable science and technology solutions to be explored and developed at sea. The largest of these vessels, the NATO Research Vessel Alliance, is an ice-capable global class vessel that is one of the world's quietest vessels, allowing for precision acoustic studies to be conducted at sea.

Research areas
CMRE is NATO's knowledge repository for maritime S&T, offering a trusted platform for NATO Nations and partners to work together and to share science and technology. CMRE provides a science and technology framework through which NATO realizes the benefits of ownership by enforcing the values of the Alliance while reducing risks, costs, and aligning national interests and ambitions. The intellectual capital thus generated has great value in creating operational advantage and equipping the future force. 

CMRE is a key node in NATO’s innovation ecosystem as the Alliance adapts to and adopts Emerging and Disruptive Technologies (EDTs). 

NATO’s innovation activities currently focus on nine priority technology areas: 

 artificial intelligence (AI),
 data,
 autonomy,
 quantum-enabled technologies,
 biotechnology,
 hypersonic technologies,
 space,
 novel materials and manufacturing, and
 energy and propulsion.

CMRE conducts relevant, state-of-the-art scientific research in EDTs, ocean science, modelling and simulation, acoustics and other disciplines, that is potentially game changing. The Centre is also active in the study of the linkage between environment, climate change and security.

CMRE contributes new technologies enabling access to unmanned systems that have the ability to sense, comprehend, predict, communicate, plan, make decisions and take appropriate actions to achieve mission goals. This provides operators with new technologies across the spectrum of expeditionary kinetic and non-kinetic capabilities required to defeat traditional threats decisively and confront irregular challenges effectively.

CMRE also provides Science & Technology enhancements to unmanned vehicles and vessels, integrated defence systems, and autonomous intelligent systems that better enable operators to complete missions in hostile environments by avoiding, defeating and surviving attacks.

CMRE produces top-notch scientific advice and contributes to proven technological solutions for capability gaps.

CMRE also offers the opportunity for collaboration in maritime and joint programmes to support acquisition, enhance interoperability and generally, prepare better for the future.

The Centre is a working example of enabling Nations to work more effectively and efficiently together by prioritising national needs, focusing on research and technology challenges, both in and out of the maritime environment, through the collective power of its world-class scientists, engineers, and specialized laboratories in collaboration with the many partners in and out of the scientific domain.

This also makes CMRE an ideal base for S&T cooperation with the EU and offers opportunities to collaborate with national S&T institutes, the wider academic world and industry.

Last but not least, CMRE is an exciting place in which to work, situated at an ideal location on the sea and near a main port, enabling synergy with regional and global academic institutes and potentially industry.

Organisation
The STO Centre for Maritime Research and Experimentation (CMRE) is an executive body of NATO's Science and Technology Organisation (STO).  Staff come from NATO member nations and bring to the Centre a broad range of scientific, technical, and support expertise. The CMRE Director is appointed by the NATO's Secretary General upon recommendation of the Science and Technology Board (STB) of the STO.

Facilities
CMRE has two ships for conducting NATO research:  the NATO Research Vessel (NRV) Alliance and the Coastal Research Vessel (CRV) Leonardo. The NRV Alliance is a 93-meter ship commissioned in 1988. Its double hull and propulsion system make it one of the quietest research vessels in the world. The smaller CRV Leonardo, commissioned in 2002, was designed for conducting experiments in shallower waters. In addition to supporting NURC's scientific mission, the two vessels are chartered to commercial or government organizations within the NATO nations.

CMRE has specialized facilities and equipment for research at-sea, including a fleet of AUVs and other unmanned vehicles and instrumentation, linear array assembly facilities, and the Oceanography Calibrating Laboratory, which provides instrument calibration according to the World Ocean Circulation Experiment (WOCE) standard.

Gallery

References

NATO agencies